Blitz  is an upcoming World War II–themed historical drama written and directed by Steve McQueen and starring Saoirse Ronan, Harris Dickinson, Erin Kellyman and Stephen Graham.

Cast
 Saoirse Ronan 
 Harris Dickinson
 Erin Kellyman
 Stephen Graham
 Paul Weller
 Kathy Burke 
 Benjamin Clementine
 Hayley Squires
 Leigh Gill
 Sally Messham
 Peter Rogers

Production

Development 
In October 2021, it was announced that McQueen would write, direct and produce a new feature film entitled Blitz for New Regency, with Lammas Park producing alongside Tim Bevan and Eric Fellner of Working Title Films. In March 2022, McQueen confirmed his next project was going to be about Londoners during the Blitz of World War II and that he had discussed this with Anne, the Princess Royal, as she had awarded him his knighthood at Windsor Castle. In June 2022, it was announced that Apple TV had picked up the distribution rights. Producers are New Regency's Arnon Milchan, Yariv Milchan and Michael Schaefer.

Casting
In September 2022, it was announced that Saoirse Ronan would be heading the cast and Adam Stockhausen leading the production design.  In December 2022, Harris Dickinson, Erin Kellyman, Stephen Graham and Kathy Burke were added to the cast, along with singer-songwriter Paul Weller in his feature film acting debut. Later that month,  Benjamin Clementine, Leigh Gill, Mica Ricketts, CJ Beckford, Hayley Squires and Sally Messham was announced in additional acting roles.

Filming
Principal photography began in London in November 2022.  Warner Bros. Studios, Leavesden was used as a base. In January 2023, filming took place close to the London Waterloo station. Later that month, special effect crews simulated bombs hitting the water in the River Thames in Wapping. Filming also took place in the London borough of Greenwich. In February 2023, reports were that the production moved to Hull's old town with a filming schedule of two weeks.

References

External links
 

Upcoming films
American films based on actual events
American historical drama films
American war drama films
American World War II films
Apple TV+ original films
Battle of Britain films
British films based on actual events
British historical drama films
British war drama films
British World War II films
Drama films based on actual events
Films directed by Steve McQueen
Films produced by Tim Bevan
Films produced by Eric Fellner
Films produced by Arnon Milchan
Films set in London
Films shot in London
Regency Enterprises films
Upcoming English-language films
Working Title Films films
World War II aviation films
World War II films based on actual events